Bianca Gascoigne (born 28 October 1986) is a British glamour model and television personality.

Biography

Personal life

Born Bianca Jade Kyle on 28 October 1986, Gascoigne is the daughter of television personality Sheryl Gascoigne (née Failes) and the adopted daughter of former footballer Paul Gascoigne. She has a brother Mason and a half-brother Regan Gascoigne.

Modelling
In September 2006, she appeared on the front cover of Loaded and in January the following year she was on the cover of Nuts. In August 2008, Gascoigne appeared on the cover of Zoo Weekly. She has also been featured in Maxim, FHM and numerous tabloid newspapers. She posed for two calendars in 2020 and 2021.

TV career
In 2006, Gascoigne won ITV's reality TV show Love Island which was set in Fiji. In July 2008, she competed against glamour model Danielle Lloyd in the TV show Gladiators in a celebrity special, which she went on to win, supporting a charity for domestic violence. She also presented Big Brother's Big Mouth from 15 to 18 July 2008, and appeared in an episode of the BBC Three reality programme Snog Marry Avoid? during which she performed a rap to POD. In 2010, Gascoigne took part in Celebrity Coach Trip with her friend Imogen Thomas. In 2012, Gascoigne auditioned for the ninth series of The X Factor and in this program she sang the Mary J. Blige song I'm Goin' Down, but failed to make it to bootcamp, as the judges claimed that there were already some "excellent" performers in her category and described her voice as being "mediocre". Gascoigne appeared in the nineteenth series of Channel 5 reality show Celebrity Big Brother, making it to the final vote on Day 32 and placing sixth.
Worked at Ryan’s Bar Sydney?

References

External links

 

Reality show winners
1986 births
Living people
Glamour models
The X Factor (British TV series) contestants